Alberto Lora Ramos (born 25 March 1987) is a Spanish footballer who plays as a right-back for Marino de Luanco.

He spent most of his professional career with Sporting de Gijón, playing 267 matches across all competitions after signing in 2006.

Club career

Sporting Gijón
Lora was born in Móstoles, Community of Madrid. A Real Madrid trainee, he served as co-captain for the Juvenil team in the 2005–06 season alongside Javier Velayos, and played 33 games as the club won the Champions Cup of the category. He started his career as a midfielder.

The following summer, Lora moved to Sporting de Gijón. Mainly registered with their reserves, he played once with the main squad during the 2007–08 campaign (a 0–1 home loss against RC Celta de Vigo), as the Asturians eventually returned from the Segunda División after ten years.

In 2009–10, due to longtime starter Rafel Sastre's age, Lora was successfully reconverted into right-back. He ended up as the undisputed first choice in that position, playing nearly 2,800 minutes as Sporting avoided La Liga relegation as 15th. The following season, his individual numbers were even better – he was the player with more minutes in the squad, leading the following player by nearly 700 minutes – as the team's final position.

On 25 March 2012, the day of his 25th birthday, Lora scored his first goal as a professional, in the last-minute to earn his side a point against Athletic Bilbao, in a 1–1 away draw. He rarely missed a match from 2012 to 2016, with the latter campaign being spent in the top flight.

Lora announced his departure from Sporting on 12 June 2018, after 12 years at the El Molinón.

Omonia
On 4 September 2018, the 31-year-old Lora moved abroad for the first time in his career and joined Cypriot First Division club AC Omonia on a two-year contract.

On 9 March 2019, he terminated the contract with AC Omonia to, after that season in the highest category of Cypriot football, El Marino de Luanco to confirm the signing of Alberto Lora and he is currently part of the squad.

Career statistics

Club

References

External links
Sporting Gijón official profile 

1987 births
Living people
People from Móstoles
Spanish footballers
Footballers from the Community of Madrid
Association football defenders
Association football midfielders
Association football utility players
La Liga players
Segunda División players
Segunda División B players
Tercera División players
Segunda Federación players
Sporting de Gijón B players
Sporting de Gijón players
Marino de Luanco footballers
Cypriot First Division players
AC Omonia players
Spanish expatriate footballers
Expatriate footballers in Cyprus
Spanish expatriate sportspeople in Cyprus